Joseph Schuster (1903–1969) was a cellist born in Constantinople of Russian-Jewish descent.

Biography
On a trip through Russia, the famous Russian composer Alexander Glazunov (1865-1936) heard young Schuster and was impressed with his talent. With Glazunov's help, Schuster entered the St. Petersburg Conservatory of Music at the age of 10 to study the cello. At the time of the Russian Revolution, his family fled to Berlin where he continued his studies under Hugo Becker at the Berlin Hochschule. In 1929, Schuster was awarded the post of solo cellist in the Berlin Philharmonic Orchestra under Furtwängler, the youngest person ever to hold that position. He remained with the Berlin Philharmonic until 1934 when he moved to New York.

His New York debut was a critical sensation, and he was immediately invited to become solo cellist with the New York Philharmonic. One of the many highlights of his New York Philharmonic career was on November 14, 1943, when he was scheduled to play Strauss's Don Quixote under Bruno Walter. Walter was ill that day and as a replacement, a very young Leonard Bernstein conducted in his debut with the New York Philharmonic. Overwhelmingly enthusiastic response by the audience and press ensured Bernstein's career was launched.

After the 1943–1944 season, Schuster left the New York Philharmonic in order to devote himself entirely to solo concert work. He and his family—wife, Katherine Schuster, and son, John Schuster—moved to Beverly Hills, California in 1947.  For the remainder of his career, Schuster traveled both nationally and internationally giving recitals and playing with the great conductors and orchestras of the world. He performed on a 1720 Goffriller cello, an instrument formerly owned by Emanuel Feuermann; later, it would be played by Jascha Silberstein.

Schuster made numerous recordings of concertos, sonatas and other chamber works with accomplished partners, such as his American Vox set of Beethoven's complete music for cello and piano with Friedrich Wührer; his first recording for that label, with the same pianist, featured the Richard Strauss and first Brahms cello sonatas. Schuster also recorded concerti with well-known orchestras.  He also appeared on radio and television programs throughout his career. He made nine enormously successful tours throughout Europe, Central and South America and Asia. Schuster was featured soloist under such conductors as Toscanini, Walter, Mitropoulos, Rodziński, Solti, Kubelík, Furtwängler, Bernstein, Jochum, Karajan, and Mehta.

References

Further reading 
"With the Artists".  World Famed String Players Discuss Their Art, Samuel and Sada Applebaum, John Markert & Co., New York (1955).  Pages 212-222 are devoted to Joseph Schuster.
  "Joseph Schuster, Rose's Rival." , chapter 7, pp. 95–106, in Steven Honigberg, Leonard Rose.  America's Golden Age and Its First Cellist, Silver Spring, The Beckham Publications Group, 2010.

1903 births
1969 deaths
American classical cellists
Russian classical cellists
20th-century classical musicians
20th-century American musicians
White Russian emigrants to Germany
German emigrants to the United States
Expatriates from the Russian Empire in the Ottoman Empire
20th-century cellists